Valognes is a commune in the Manche department in Normandy in north-western France.

Geography
Valognes is situated in the Cotentin Peninsula, southeast of Cherbourg. Valognes station has rail connections to Caen, Paris and Cherbourg.

History
The town was built not far from the Gallo-Roman town of Alauna or Alaunia, from where the town derives its name. It was a fortified stronghold under the Norman dukes and French monarchs. Also here, William the Conqueror received the news that the barons of Cotentin and Bessin were conspiring to kill him, enabling him to escape to Falaise. Edward III of England took Valognes without resistance, spent one night there and then pillaged and burnt the city. Henry III of England possessed the town, which remained under English rule for thirty years. (It would be a kind of resort for English aristocratic visitors until the 1920s.) In 1588, during the French Wars of Religion, Valognes sided with the Catholic League. The castle, like that of Cherbourg, was completely destroyed under Louis XIV. Of the convent of the Capuchins and Cordeliers and the abbey of Benedictine nuns, which existed in Valognes prior to 1792, only the latter remains and was transformed into the hospice of the Rue des Religieuses.

The 14th-century church of Notre Dame had a dome (dated 1612), the only example of a Gothic dome in France. The whole building was destroyed in 1944 during the Battle of Normandy.

Before the French Revolution, Valognes was the residence of more than a hundred families of distinguished birth and fortune, and was for a long time afterwards the home, en villégiature, of many of the old noblesse. Thus the town was known as the Versailles of Normandy for its aristocratic mansions and palaces, as well as the quiet, mysterious ambience and exclusivity of its streets. This was the Valognes of Barbey d'Aurevilly.

The 1928 Methuen guide book to Normandy by Cyril Scudamore rather more prosaically describes Valognes as "a clean and well-built town, whose fine old houses bear witness to its former prosperity".

Little remains of Valognes's famous architectural heritage, as many of the aristocratic mansions were reduced to rubble during the battle of Normandy. The lovely hôtel de Beaumont, however, still stands.

Population

Heraldry

Museums
The town has two museums devoted to the two alcoholic drinks for which Normandy is known: one for cider, the other for the apple brandy called calvados.

Twin towns

Valognes is twinned with
 Wimborne in Dorset, England
 Stolberg in Rhineland, Germany

Notable people 
 Félix Vicq-d'Azyr born on 23 April 1746
 Edelestand du Méril (1801–1870), French medievalist and philologist.
 Frédéric Guilbert born 24 December 1994 in Valognes, French professional footballer.

See also
 Communes of the Manche department

References

External links

 Valognes ville d'art et d'histoire (official site)
 History of the Hotel de Beaumont, grand historic house in the town

Communes of Manche